Nautilus is the fictional submarine belonging to Captain Nemo featured in Jules Verne's novels Twenty Thousand Leagues Under the Sea (1870) and The Mysterious Island (1874). Verne named the Nautilus after Robert Fulton's real-life submarine Nautilus (1800). For the design of the Nautilus Verne was inspired by the French Navy submarine Plongeur, a model of which he had seen at the 1867 Exposition Universelle, three years before writing his novel.

Description 
Nautilus is described by Verne as "a masterpiece containing masterpieces". It is designed and commanded by Captain Nemo. Electricity provided by sodium/mercury batteries (with the sodium provided by extraction from seawater) is the craft's primary power source for propulsion and other services. The energy needed to extract the sodium is provided by coal mined from the sea floor.

Nautilus is double-hulled, and is further separated into water-tight compartments. In Captain Nemo's own words:

Nautilus uses floodable tanks in order to adjust buoyancy and so control its depth. The pumps that evacuate these tanks of water are so powerful that they produce large jets of water when the vessel emerges rapidly from the surface of the water. This leads many early observers of Nautilus to believe that the vessel is some species of marine mammal, or perhaps a sea monster not yet known to science. To submerge deeply in a short time, Nautilus uses a technique called "hydroplaning", in which the vessel dives down at a steep angle.

Nautilus supports a crew that gathers food from the sea. Nautilus includes a galley for preparing these foods, which includes a machine that makes drinking water from seawater through distillation. Nautilus is not able to refresh its air supply, so Captain Nemo designed it to do this by surfacing and exchanging stale air for fresh, much like a whale. Nautilus is capable of extended voyages without refueling or otherwise restocking supplies. Its maximum dive time is around five days.

Much of the ship is decorated to standards of luxury that are unequalled in a seagoing vessel of the time. These include a library containing about twelve thousand books, with boxed collections of valuable oceanic specimens. The library is also filled with expensive paintings and other works of art. Nautilus also features a lavish dining room and even an organ that Captain Nemo uses to entertain himself in the evening. By comparison, Nemo's personal quarters are very sparsely furnished, but do feature duplicates of the bridge instruments, so that the captain can keep track of the vessel without being present on the bridge. These amenities however, are only available to Nemo, Professor Aronnax, and his companions.

From her attacks on ships, using a ramming prow to puncture target vessels below the waterline, the world thinks it a sea monster, but later identifies it as an underwater vessel capable of great destructive power, after Abraham Lincoln is attacked and Ned Land strikes the metallic surface of Nautilus with his harpoon.

Its parts are built to order by companies including Creusot and Cail & Co. in France, Pen & Co. and Laird's in England, Scott's in Scotland, Krupp in Prussia, the Motala workshops in Sweden, and Hart Bros. in the United States. Then they are assembled by Nemo's men on a desert island. Nautilus returned to this island, where Nemo later helped castaways in the novel The Mysterious Island. After Nemo dies on board, the volcanic island erupts, entombing the Captain and Nautilus for eternity.

Claimed Links between Captain Nemo's Nautilus and the Confederate warship CSS Alabama 
In 1998 the Jules Verne scholar William Butcher was the first to identify a possible link between the Birkenhead, England built CSS Alabama and Captain Nemo’s Nautilus. The CSS Alabama was a warship built in secrecy for the Confederate States by Lairds shipyard of Birkenhead, England in the American Civil War. Butcher stated that The Alabama, which claimed to have sunk 75 merchantmen, was destroyed by the Unionist Kearsarge off Cherbourg on 11th June 1864…. This battle has clear connections with Nemo’s final attack, also in the English Channel.

Jules Verne had himself made a previous comparison between the Birkenhead built CSS Alabama and the Nautilus in a letter to his publisher Pierre-Jules Hetzel in March 1869.

In September 2021 the Birkenhead born geography teacher John Lamb noted that both the hull of the fictional Nautilus and the hull of the real-life Confederate warship CSS Alabama had been built in secret at the Laird's shipyard in Birkenhead, lying opposite the port of Liverpool. Furthermore, both vessels had been completed on a ‘desert island’ - in the case of the Alabama on the Azores Island of Terceira

In Jules Verne's Twenty Thousand Leagues Under the Seas (1869) Captain Nemo explains how he built the Nautilus… "Each of its components, Dr Aronnax, was sent to me from a different point on the globe via a forwarding address. ….  the iron plates for its hull by Laird’s of Liverpool…. I set up my workshops on a small desert island in the middle of the ocean. There with my workmen, that is my good companions whom I instructed and trained, I completed our Nautilus."

According to the historian Stephen Fox, Captain Raphael Semmes had portraits of General Robert E Lee and the Confederate President Jefferson Davis on the cabin wall of the CSS Alabama. In Jules Verne’s Twenty Thousand Leagues Under the Seas, Captain Nemo has portraits of Abraham Lincoln and the radical abolitionist John Brown adorning the cabin walls of the Nautilus. Raphael Semmes was a supporter of slavery while Captain Nemo is a militant antislaver.

The two-year voyage of the CSS Alabama had covered a distance of approximately 75,000 miles which equates to just over 21,700 leagues in the Nautilus and Jules Verne may have chosen Captain Nemo’s motto of ‘Mobilis in Mobile’ (sometimes changed to Mobilis in Mobili) quite simply because the captain of the CSS Alabama – Raphael Semmes, was a part time lawyer from Mobile, Alabama.

In 1869 Captain Raphael Semmes released his American Civil War memoirs entitled Memoirs of Service Afloat During the War Between the States. In the same year of 1869, Jules Verne released his classic novel Twenty Thousand leagues Under the Seas John Lamb catalogued the many similarities between the two books on his website Jules Verne and the Heroes of Birkenhead in August 2022.

John Lamb hypothesized that to Jules Verne the CSS Alabama and Captain Nemo's Nautilus might essentially be one and the same and that the militant abolitionist Captain Nemo is the ‘alter ego’ of the pro slavery Raphael Semmes - i.e. the ‘opposite of oneself’

In their respective books, Memoirs Afloat During the War Between the States (1869) and Twenty Thousand Leagues Under the Seas (1869), both Raphael Semmes and Jules Verne mention world shipping being alarmed by a destructive maritime force which is compared to a ‘sea monster’, in both books the monster is jeered at in the press and celebrated in song.

Raphael Semmes was denounced by Abraham Lincoln as a ‘pirate’ and a bounty put on his head by the U.S Navy Department of Admiral David Farragut. The fictional Captain Nemo is also denounced as a pirate in Twenty Thousand Leagues Under the Sea and the Nautilus is chased by a warship called the USS Abraham Lincoln, whose commander, a Captain Farragut offers a reward for the first sighting of the ‘sea monster’.

Both Raphael Semmes and Jules Verne talk about their respective vessels as being illuminated by an eerie light and slowly moving in circles around their ‘prey’. The CSS Alabama and the Nautilus both have a specialized recess in their hull, and a state-of-the-art water condenser on board to provide fresh water for their multinational crews.

Both the CSS Alabama and the Nautilus encounter an imaginary island, sail through a patch of white water, have an aversion for the coast of Brazil, but still pause to describe the fresh waters of the Amazon as they pour in to the sea.

Raphael Semmes seeks sanctuary for the CSS Alabama on the Brazilian volcanic island of Fernando de Noronha, where he takes on coal from his supply ship Agrippina whereas Captain Nemo seeks sanctuary for the Nautilus within the flooded crater of a secret volcanic island where his crew proceed to mine their own coal.

On the respective voyages of both the CSS Alabama and the Nautilus an elaborate funeral is described in detail and both captains are visibly overcome with emotion. while both authors talk about a grave / mausoleum sealed up by coral over time.

Both Raphael Semmes and Captain Nemo describe the nature and the effects of the Gulf Stream in detail, both have a ‘museum of curiosities’ gathered on dingy trips, and while Raphael Semmes collects an Amazonian seed pod that looks like a Havanna cigar, Captain Nemo gives Doctor Aronnax a seaweed cigar which Doctor Aronnax mistakes for a Havanna cigar.

Both Raphael Semmes and Captain Nemo talk about sleeping sperm whales and highlight the dangers to right whales in venturing into the warm waters near the equator. Both Raphael Semmes and Captain Nemo kill a single albatross, sail through swarms of argonauts / nautilus, and refer to food that a Malay would cook.

Raphael Semmes claims a fully grown swordfish can pierce a ship’s wooden hull while Doctor Aronnax claims a giant Narwhal’s tusk can pierce a ship’s hull.

Both Raphael Semmes and Jules Verne describe the journey across the Indian Ocean as tedious to everyone but the natural historian, and then come across ships from the P and O Line. Both Raphael Semmes and Captain Nemo pride themselves on their good manners and hospitality, but both lament the passing of sail to be replaced by steam.

Whereas Raphael Semmes comments at length on the sinking of the Liverpool built Confederate commerce raider CSS Florida it is Captain Nemo and the Nautilus who come across the remains of a ship called the Florida (a Confederate link first identified by the Jules Verne scholar William Butcher in 1998).

Both Raphael Semmes and Captain Nemo pay tribute to the oceanographer Matthew Fontaine Maury and comment on his fall from grace after the American Civil War. Whereas Captain Semmes compares the CSS Alabama to his wife Captain Nemo compares the Nautilus to himself. Raphael Semmes laments the loss of the British built CSS Alabama and its largely British crew as if it were the loss of his wife and children, whereas Captain Nemo laments the actual loss of his wife and children – killed by the British. Whereas Raphael Semmes states that India should never be free from British rule, Captain Nemo is later revealed to be an Indian who fought to be free from British rule.

In the 1874 sequel novel to Twenty Thousand Leagues Under the Sea entitled The Mysterious Island Captain Nemo returns and is revealed as the rebel Indian Prince Dakkar a possible derivation of the Afrikaan CSS Alabama celebratory song Daar Kom die Alibama ('Here Comes the Alabama') whereby moving the letter 'k' two spaces to the left gives the phrase Dakar om die Alibama.

In November 2021, Alan Evans the Director of Regeneration and Place at Wirral Borough Council, endorsed the further claim of John Lamb that Jules Verne had set his sequel novel The Mysterious Island in Birkenhead and the Wirral Peninsula, so confirming that the Nautilus and Captain Nemo had indeed returned back to their spiritual home of Birkenhead - also the home port of the CSS Alabama.

Notable appearances

Beside their original appearances in Twenty Thousand Leagues Under the Sea and The Mysterious Island, Nautilus and Captain Nemo have appeared in numerous other works.

In the 1954 film adaptation of the first novel and in The Return of Captain Nemo, it is suggested that Nautilus is powered by nuclear energy (discovered by Nemo himself), and that Nemo uses the same energy to destroy Vulcania, Nautilus's base island.

In the 1969 film Captain Nemo and the Underwater City, Nautilus and its sister ship Nautilus II are depicted as industrialised stingray-like vessels, flattened with pronounced tumblehomes supporting rounded deckhouses. Each has a heavy girderwork tail, at the tip of which twin rudders and diving planes are mounted.

In Kevin J. Anderson's Captain Nemo: The Fantastic History of a Dark Genius, Nautilus appears as a real submarine, apparently cigar-shaped like the one from the novel, built by Nemo for the Ottoman Empire.

In Alan Moore and Kevin O'Neill's The League of Extraordinary Gentlemen, Nautilus features with a squid-like appearance in the graphic novel and a more traditional - albeit extremely tall - submarine in the film.  Toward the closing stages of the film, antagonist "The Fantom" has stolen Nemo's design and begun construction of multiple submarines dubbed "Nautili" by Skinner.

Other Verne submarines 
Submarines feature in some other of Verne's works. In the 1896 novel Facing the Flag, the pirate Ker Karraje uses an unnamed submarine that acts both as a tug to his schooner Ebba and for ramming and destroying ships which are the targets of his piracy. The same book also features HMS Sword, a small Royal Navy experimental submarine which is sunk after a valiant but unequal struggle with the pirate submarine. In the book The Master of the World, Robur's secondary vehicle, Terror, is a strange flying machine with submarine, automobile and speedboat capabilities. It briefly eludes naval forces on the Great Lakes by diving.

Images

See also 
 Ships named Nautilus
 Nautilus, a mollusc
 List of fictional ships

Notes

External links 

 Jules Verne's text in 20,000 Leagues under the Sea provides a great deal of information about Nautilus as discussed on this page: Jules Verne's Nautilus. Many artists and ordinary folk have envisioned over the decades their own interpretations of Nautilus: A Catalog of Nautilus Designs

Fictional submarines
Jules Verne
Twenty Thousand Leagues Under the Sea